The Denver Rangers were a professional hockey team based in Denver, Colorado that played for two seasons in the late 1980s. They were a member of the International Hockey League, and an affiliate of the New York Rangers. The team was originally known as the Indianapolis Checkers, but after the 1986–1987 season the team moved to Denver. The team was originally known as the Colorado Rangers for the 1987–1988 season. After the 1988–1989 season the team moved to Phoenix, Arizona and became known as the Phoenix Roadrunners.

Standings

References
Denver Rangers at the Internet Hockey Database

Defunct sports teams in Colorado
Defunct ice hockey teams in the United States
International Hockey League (1945–2001) teams
Ice hockey teams in Colorado
Sports teams in Denver
Ice hockey clubs established in 1987
Sports clubs disestablished in 1989
1987 establishments in Colorado
1989 disestablishments in Colorado